Henicero may be a misspelling of:

 Cenicero, a municipality in La Rioja, Spain.
 Genízaro, Hispano Native Americans in the southwest United States